Matthew Robert Duncan (8 July 1863 – 23 February 1938) was a Conservative member of the House of Commons of Canada from 1921 to 1926. He was born in Owen Sound, Canada West, was an alderman there for eleven years, and was the city's mayor in 1905 and 1906.

Duncan attended high school at Owen Sound and became president of Owen Sound Cereal Mills Ltd. He was elected to Parliament in the 1921 general election to represent the Grey North riding, and re-elected in 1925. In the 1926 election he was defeated by William Pattison Telford, Jr. of the Liberals.

References

External links
 

1863 births
1938 deaths
Canadian businesspeople in retailing
Conservative Party of Canada (1867–1942) MPs
Mayors of places in Ontario
Members of the House of Commons of Canada from Ontario
People from Owen Sound